You'll Rebel to Anything is the third studio album by New York City band Mindless Self Indulgence released on April 12, 2005. The album was released outside of the US on November 5, 2007, in an "Expanded and Remastered" edition. On January 22, 2008, the "Expanded and Remastered" version was released in the US. A special Japanese version of the remastered edition was released on March 5, 2008, which includes a demo version of "Bomb This Track", the completed version of which can be found on If.

This album resulted in many firsts for the band: it was their first studio album to feature Lyn-Z on bass, first studio album to have alternate versions, first studio album to reach the Billboard, first studio album to be released outside of the US, first studio album in which clean versions of all the tracks were released to retail, and their first studio album to have music videos based on tracks besides those excerpted from live shows.

Track listing

Cover 
The cover on the album is a blue cross made up of many video game controllers and systems, including the Nintendo GameCube, PlayStation, PlayStation 2, Xbox, Atari 2600, Nintendo Entertainment System, Super NES, Genesis, and the Power Glove. The cover for the Japanese version is a parody of the cover art on Another Mindless Rip Off.

Music videos 
"You'll Rebel to Anything" (directed by Alexander Serpico)
"Shut Me Up" (directed by Jhonen Vasquez)
"Straight to Video" (directed by Poz Lang)
"Molly" (on the Expanded/Remastered Version)

Personnel
James "Little Jimmy Urine" Euringer – vocals, lyrics, producer, arranger, recording, programming
Steven "Steve, Righ?" Montano – guitar, backup vocals
Lindsey Ann "Lyn-Z" Way – bass guitar
Jennifer "Kitty" Dunn – drums
Kenny Muhammad The Human Orchestra – beatboxing on "La-Di-Da-Di"
James Galus – producer, arranger
Gene Freeman – additional producer, engineering, mixing
Sal Mormando – engineering
Will Quinnell – mastering
Clinton Bradley – additional sound design & effects
Gary Baker – pro-tools technician

References

Mindless Self Indulgence albums
2005 albums
Albums produced by Machine (producer)